Badgeworth railway station served the village of Badgeworth, Gloucestershire, England, from 1843 to 1846 on the Birmingham and Gloucester Railway.

History 
The station was opened on 22 August 1843 by the Birmingham and Gloucester Railway. It was a short-lived station, closing three years later in October 1846.

References

Sources 

C.J. Wignall - Complete British Railways Maps and Gazetteer from 1830-1981 - Oxford Publishing Company 1983

Disused railway stations in Gloucestershire
Railway stations in Great Britain opened in 1843
Railway stations in Great Britain closed in 1846
1843 establishments in England
1846 disestablishments in England